Chino Valley High School is a high school in Chino Valley, Arizona, United States. It is the only high school under the jurisdiction of the Chino Valley Unified School District.

Notable alumni
 Andy Pratt, former MLB player (Atlanta Braves, Chicago Cubs)

References

Public high schools in Arizona
Schools in Yavapai County, Arizona
1989 establishments in Arizona